Althenia bilocularis is a plant found in both Australia and New Zealand, in fresh to brackish waters. In Australia it is found in all mainland states with the exception of the Northern Territory.  In New Zealand it is found on the North, South and Chatham Islands.

Taxonomy
It was first described as Lepilaena bilocularis by Thomas Kirk in 1896. 
It was transferred to the genus, Althenia, in 1927 by Leonard Cockayne. This change by Cockayne is supported by DNA analyses.

References

Potamogetonaceae
Taxa named by Thomas Kirk
Plants described in 1896